El Gastor is a city located in the province of Cádiz, Spain. According to the 2005 census, the city has a population of 1,948 inhabitants.

Demographics

References

External links 

El Gastor - Sistema de Información Multiterritorial de Andalucía
http://www.elgastor.es

Gastor, El